No Way Back is a 1995 American action film written and directed by Frank A. Cappello. The film stars Russell Crowe, Helen Slater and Etsushi Toyokawa. The film was released in 1996 in the United States.

Plot
When an undercover FBI agent with a secret agenda (Kelly Hu) murders the skin head son (Ian Ziering) of high-ranking crime boss Frank Serlano (Michael Lerner), the mafioso retaliates by kidnapping the son of Zach Grant (Russell Crowe), the FBI agent in charge of the botched undercover sting.  Simultaneously, Yuji (Etsushi Toyokawa), wanted dead by the Yakuza for forthcoming legal testimony, breaks free from Grant's supervision during a trans-Atlantic flight.  He forces their airplane, along with Mary (Helen Slater), the ditzy stewardess accompanying them, to make an emergency-landing.  In an attempt to free Yuji from the gaze of the Yakuza and regain custody of Zach's child from the mafia, the three crash survivors go off of the grid and set into motion a dangerous plan that could quickly facilitate their untimely demise.

Cast
 Russell Crowe as FBI Agent Zack Grant
 Helen Slater as Mary
 Etsushi Toyokawa as Yuji Kobayashi
 Michael Lerner as Frank Serlano
 Kyūsaku Shimada as Tetsuro
 Ian Ziering as Victor Serlano
 François Chau as FBI Agent Gim Takakura
 Kelly Hu as Seiko Kobayashi
 Andrew J. Ferchland as Eric Grant

Reception
Denise Lanctot of Entertainment Weekly rated it D+ and wrote that it would have made a better video game.  Scott Hamilton and Chris Holland of Radio Times rated it 1/5 stars and called it a "preposterous crime thriller".  R.L. Shaffer of IGN rated it 5/10 and recommended that fans of the stars watch their other films instead.  Ian Jane of DVD Talk rated it 2.5/5 stars and wrote, "A wholly mediocre thriller, No Way Back will be of passing interesting to Russell Crowe fans and those who enjoy low budget action movies but outside of that group, it'll probably fall pretty flat."

References

External links
 
 
 

1995 films
1995 action films
1995 crime thriller films
1990s English-language films
American action films
American crime thriller films
Films about contract killing
Films about organized crime in the United States
American gangster films
Films about hostage takings
American police detective films
Columbia Pictures films
Films produced by Joel Soisson
Yakuza films
1990s American films
1990s Japanese films